Shahlar Isa oglu Huseynov (26 November 1968, in Hankavan village, Armenia SSR – 10 April 1992, in Tartar District, Azerbaijan) was the National Hero of Azerbaijan, and warrior during the First Nagorno-Karabakh War in the early 1990s.

Early life and education 
Huseynov was born on 26 November 1968 in Hankavan village of Armenia SSR. In 1985, he completed his secondary education at Hankavan village secondary school. From 1986 through 1988, Huseynov served in the Soviet Armed Forces.

Personal life 
He was single.

First Nagorno-Karabakh War 
When Khojaly was captured by ethnic Armenian forces on 26 February 1992 during the First Nagorno-Karabakh War, Huseynov voluntarily joined The Ganja Battalion and went to the front-line. Since Huseynov was able to speak Armenian language fluently, he was always sent to the intelligence operations to collect information about military plans. On April 10, 1992, the attack of the Armenian soldiers to Shikharkh village was prevented, and Huseynov was killed in that battle.

Honors 
Shahlar Isa oglu Huseynov was posthumously awarded the title of the "National Hero of Azerbaijan" by Presidential Decree No. 833 dated 7 June 1992.

He was buried at a Martyrs' Lane cemetery in Ganja, Azerbaijan. A street in Ganja was named after him.

See also 
 First Nagorno-Karabakh War
 National Hero of Azerbaijan
 Ganja Battalion

References

Sources 
Vugar Asgarov. Azərbaycanın Milli Qəhrəmanları (Yenidən işlənmiş II nəşr). Bakı: "Dərələyəz-M", 2010, səh. 127.

1968 births
1992 deaths
Azerbaijani military personnel
Azerbaijani military personnel of the Nagorno-Karabakh War
Azerbaijani military personnel killed in action
National Heroes of Azerbaijan
People from Kotayk Province